Somnambuul is a 2003 Estonian drama film directed by Sulev Keedus.

The film is set in autumn 1944 in Estonia. Thousands of people are fleeing to the west in order to free from Soviet occupation. A young woman, Eetla, is about to reach to a boat, but in the last moment she resigns and goes back to her home. Her father is the only one on the island, who also didn't escape. Fear, dreams and unknown future are ahead.

Awards:
 2004: Festival Baltyk-o-Balkan (Paris, France), 2004, Grand Prix

Cast
Evald Aavik as Gottfried, lighthouse keeper Gottfried
Katariina Unt as Eetla, Gottfried's daughter Eetla
Ivo Uukkivi as Kasper, war refugee
Jan Uuspõld as Ivan, Russian soldier

References

External links
 
 Somnambuul, entry in Estonian Film Database (EFIS)

2003 films
Estonian drama films
Estonian-language films
Baltic states World War II films